Vinstra Station is a railway station located at the village of Vinstra in Nord-Fron, Norway. The station is located on the Dovre Line and served express trains to Oslo and Trondheim. The station was opened in 1896 when the Dovre Line was extended from Tretten to Otta.

Railway stations in Oppland
Railway stations on the Dovre Line
Railway stations opened in 1896
1896 establishments in Norway